Prunus marsupialis is a species of plant in the family Rosaceae. It is found in the Philippines and Taiwan.

References

marsupialis
Least concern plants
Taxonomy articles created by Polbot